Cikava is a small settlement in the Municipality of Mokronog-Trebelno in southeastern Slovenia. The municipality is now included in the Southeast Slovenia Statistical Region. Historically the area was part of Lower Carniola.

References

External links
Cikava on Geopedia

Populated places in the Municipality of Mokronog-Trebelno